May Emmeline Wirth (6 June 189418 October 1978) was an Australian circus and vaudeville performer famous for her ability to do somersaults forwards and backwards on a running horse.

Early life

Wirth was born in Bundaberg, Queensland on 6 June 1894. She was the daughter of a Mauritian circus artist, John Edward Zinga (Despoges) and Dezeppo Marie, née Beaumont. 

In 1901, Wirth was adopted by Mary Wirth, an equestrienne and the sister of Wirth's Circus proprietors Philip and George Wirth.

Career

From age 10, With began performing in balancing and equestrian shows in Melbourne ands Sydney.

Wirth performed with the Barnum and Bailey circus in the US, and was the star of Wirth's Circus in 1916, as the "greatest bareback riding star".

When aged 19, during her second year in the United States, she suffered severe injuries while performing in Brooklyn after her horse shied and she was dragged around the ring when her foot became caught.

She stopped performing in 1937 and started living in New York.

Personal life 
On 27 November 1919, Wirth married her manager, Frank White who adopted her surname. The couple did not have children. She died in Sarasota, Florida in 1978 and was cremated.

Legacy 
She was inducted to the Circus Hall of Fame as a bareback rider in 1964.

Wirth and her step-sister appeared on an Australia Post commemorative postage stamp issued on 13 March 1997 commemorating 150 years of circus in Australia.

References

External links 

 Wirth's Circus Home Movies - National Film and Sound Archive of Australia

1894 births
1978 deaths
People from Bundaberg
Australian circus performers
Australian female equestrians
Vaudeville performers
Contortionists
Australian expatriates in the United States